Johnsonville is a sausage company headquartered in Sheboygan Falls, Wis. Founded in 1945, by Ralph and Alice Stayer, when they opened a butcher shop and named it after their hometown community of Johnsonville, Wisconsin, it is one of the largest sausage producers in the United States and the largest sausage brand by revenue in the United States. Johnsonville sausage is available in more than 45 countries. Privately owned, the company has approximately 2,000 employees and it is run by CEO Michael Stayer-Suprick.

Products 
Johnsonville produces over 70 different types of sausage products, including: brats, grillers, Italian sausage, smoked-cooked links, breakfast sausage in fully cooked and fresh varieties, chicken sausage, meatballs and summer sausage.

In 2021, based on a survey of 15,000 U.S. shoppers, Johnsonville won a best new product award for its Sausage Strips, which look and cook like bacon but are actually made from sausage.

Harvest Facilities 
In 2014, Johnsonville had the most sow harvest capacity in the United States, with the facilities to harvest 3,400 pigs daily.

Sponsorships 
In 2017, Johnsonville became the title sponsor for the American Cornhole League. Explaining why it sponsors cornhole, the company's director over strategic growth said the game is played, "where people enjoy our products--in backyards during barbecues and tailgate parties."

Also in 2016 Johnsonville began sponsoring BaconFest, a fundraising event in Naples, Florida, hosted by the Kiwanis Club of Pelican Bay. The one-day event draws 7,000 people.

References

External links

 Official Site
  "The History of the Johnsonville Sausage Company, Dec 5, 2020,                                  Seehafer News

Brand name meats
German-American history
Sheboygan County, Wisconsin
Food and drink companies based in Wisconsin
Privately held companies based in Wisconsin
Sausage companies of the United States
1945 establishments in Wisconsin
Food and drink companies established in 1945